Tadeusz Arentowicz (19 September 1909 – 8 July 1941) was a Polish fighter pilot and ace during the Second World War. He served as a flight Lieutenant in the Royal Air Force in the No. 303 Polish Fighter Squadron.  He was B-group Flight Commander of the squadron.  A week after his final promotion, in 1941, he was on a mission escorting bombers when his plane was shot down by a German fighter near Dunkirk over the English Channel; he was never found.

Military career

Tadeusz Arentowicz was a graduate of the Polish Air Force University in Dęblin (VII Promotion). On the fifteenth of August 1933 he was given the rank of second lieutenant in the Polish Air Force and was assigned to the 1st Air Regiment stationed in Warsaw. He finished his training in Grudziądz, and became an instructor at the Ułęż airport near Dęblin on March 1939.  See No. 315 Polish Fighter Squadron.

He participated in the September Campaign as a member of the Dęblin Group. He evacuated to Romania from the Wielick airport with other pilots. He  waited to be picked up by the English at Port of Constanța. The English transports never arrived to pick him and the others up. He managed to make his way to France and proceeded on to England.

He received his service number of P-0251 in 1941. After he was trained to use British equipment he was assigned to the 303rd Polish Fighter Squadron. He fulfilled the duties of squadron leader after the death of Zdzisław Henneberg and came to be the commander of the whole squadron on 3 July 1941.

He joined 303 after the Battle of Britain.  His career is enigmatic, as little is known; but he was known by the nickname, "Szpak" ('Starling' in English).  Although he started as a flight lieutenant, death (Zdzisław Henneberg) and injury (Wacław Łapkowski) of his predecessors created a vacancy, and he was elevated to Flight Commander.

On 3 March 1941, after the Squadron had been upgraded to Spitfire Mk IIA planes, Arentowich led the attack at the German airfield at Le Touquet, another at Waben, and strafed an army transport depot at Breck-sur-Mer.

On 16 April 1941, Arentowich had become the acting Commanding Office. He presented a nomination of Waclaw Lapkowski (a second time) for the Cross of Valor.

On 11 March 1941, ground control vectored him and two other pilots to attack an aircraft at 10,000 feet.  This incident came to be called "A Little Mistake" in the squadron's log.  Arentowicz was part of an attack by three Polish Spitfires on a friendly Armstrong Whitworth Whitley that was involved in paratroop training.  Fortunately, and despite 100 hits, the plane survived and no injuries were experienced.

He was given a prominent role during at least one ceremonial occasion.

He was at the helm of Spitfire II PF 8385 IMPREGNABLE and damaged a Messerschmitt Bf 109 on 25 June 1941.

Death

On 8 July 1941, he flew the Supermarine Spitfire (designation P 8502) on mission to escort bombers to destroy the railway line and station in Lille. He was shot down by a German fighter and fell into the sea (the other pilots saw him crash somewhere near Dunkirk). Polish forces searched for him but he was never found.

He was replaced as Squadron Commander by Lieutenant Jankiewicz.

He is remembered on the Polish Memorial to Aircrew in Warsaw and the Polish War Memorial near RAF Northolt.

Awards
 Aviator badge
Polish Cross of Valour
Field Pilot's Badge

See also
2018 film Hurricane: 303 Squadron
 Air Force of the Polish Army
 List of Royal Air Force aircraft squadrons
 Non-British personnel in the RAF during the Battle of Britain, emphasizing the experience of the transplanted pilots and the superiority of their tactics.
 Polish Air Forces
 Polish Air Forces in Great Britain,\
 Polish contribution to World War II

References

Bibliography

Notes

Further reading
 
 Caldwell, Donald. The JG26 War Diary, Vol. 1: 1939–1942. London: Grub Street, 1996. .
 
 Ken Delve, D-Day: The Air Battle, London: Arms & Armour Press, 1994, .
 Fiedler, Arkady. Dywizjon 303 (in Polish). London: Peter Davies Ltd., 1942. (Translated as Squadron 303: The Polish Fighter Squadron with the R.A.F.. London: Peter Davies Ltd., 1942/New York: Roy Publishers, 1943. Reprint Kessinger Publishing, 2007.) New edition  303 Squadron: The Legendary Battle of Britain Fighter Squadron  translated by Jarek Garliński. Los Angeles: Aquila Polonica, 2010 hard cover:  Trade paperback .
  
 
 Gretzyngier, Robert. Polskie Skrzydła 4: Hawker Hurricane, część 1 (in Polish). Sandomierz, Poland: Stratus, 2005. .
 Gretzyngier, Robert and Wojtek Matusiak. Polish Aces of World War 2. London: Osprey, 1998. .
 Halley, James J. The Squadrons of the Royal Air Force & Commonwealth, 1918–1988. Tonbridge, Kent, UK: Air-Britain (Historians) Ltd., 1988. .
 Jefford, C.G. RAF Squadrons, a Comprehensive Record of the Movement and Equipment of all RAF Squadrons and their Antecedents since 1912. Shrewsbury, UK: Airlife Publishing, 2001. .
 
 .

External links
Polish Air force website
No. 303 Squadron Picture Gallery Photograph

1909 births
1941 deaths
Polish military personnel of World War II
Polish World War II pilots
People from Sierpc
Royal Air Force personnel killed in World War II
Royal Air Force officers
Polish Air Force officers